John Albert Edward William Spencer-Churchill, 10th Duke of Marlborough,  (18 September 1897 – 11 March 1972), styled Marquess of Blandford until 1934, was a British military officer and peer.

Early life

He was born in London on 18 September 1897 as the first of two sons born to Charles Spencer-Churchill, 9th Duke of Marlborough and his first wife, the former Consuelo Vanderbilt, an American railroad heiress. His younger brother was Lord Ivor Spencer-Churchill who joined the Royal Army Service Corps and fought in the First World War. His parents separated in 1906 and divorced in 1921. Later that year his mother married Lt. Col. Jacques Balsan, a French balloon, aircraft, and hydroplane pilot, and his father married the French American Gladys Deacon.

His paternal grandparents were George Spencer-Churchill, 8th Duke of Marlborough and his first wife, Lady Albertha Hamilton (a daughter of James Hamilton, 1st Duke of Abercorn and Lady Louisa Russell).

His mother was the eldest child, and only daughter, of William Kissam Vanderbilt, a New York railroad millionaire, and the former Alva Erskine Smith.  They divorced in 1895; she married his friend Oliver Belmont and he married the widow Anna Harriman. His maternal uncles were William Kissam Vanderbilt II and Harold Stirling Vanderbilt.

Marlborough was educated at Eton before joining the Life Guards.

Career
Prior to inheriting the dukedom in 1934, he was a lieutenant-colonel in the Life Guards, and served with distinction in France and Belgium during World War I.  After the war, he served as Mayor of Woodstock, where Blenheim is located, from 1937 to 1942. His wife served as the first woman mayor of Woodstock. He also served as High Steward of Oxford in 1937. He enlisted during World War II and was a military liaison officer with the United States forces in Britain.

In 1950, the Duke opened the grounds and many rooms of Blenheim Palace (including the bedroom in which Sir Winston Churchill was born) to the public to help defray the cost of upkeep. Today, he is known as one of the originators of the "stately homes" business.

Personal life

On 17 February 1920, he was married to the Hon. Alexandra Mary Cadogan (1900–1961) at a ceremony at St Margaret's Church in London attended by King George V and Queen Mary. As a wedding gift, his maternal grandfather gave him a house in London. She was a daughter of Henry Cadogan, Viscount Chelsea, the son and heir of George Henry Cadogan, 5th Earl Cadogan. Together, they had two sons and three daughters:

 Lady Sarah Consuelo Spencer-Churchill (1921–2000), who married Edwin Fariman Russell (1914–2001) in Westminster in 1943. They divorced in Reno, Nevada in 1966 and she married Guy Burgos Ossa the same year. They divorced in 1967 in Mexico and she married thirdly to Theo Roubanis in Philadelphia in 1967.
 Lady Caroline Spencer-Churchill (1923–1992), who married Major Charles Huguenot Waterhouse (1918–2007) of Middleton Hall, Middleton-by-Youlgreave in Woodstock, Oxfordshire in 1946.
 John George Vanderbilt Henry Spencer-Churchill, 11th Duke of Marlborough (1926–2014), who married four times.
 Lady Rosemary Mildred Spencer-Churchill (b. 1929), a lady in waiting to Queen Elizabeth II, she married Charles Robert Muir (d. 1972) at Oxford in 1953.  
 Lord Charles George William Colin Spencer-Churchill (1940–2016), who married Gillian Spreckels Fuller (b. 1946), a great-granddaughter of California industrialist and financier John D. Spreckels, in 1965. They divorced in 1968 and in 1970, he married Elizabeth Jane Wyndham (b. 1948), a great-niece of the interior decorator Nancy Lancaster.

Second marriage
Six weeks before his death, on 26 January 1972, the Duke married his second wife, (Frances) Laura (née Charteris) Canfield (1915–1990), the widow of the American publishing heir Michael Temple Canfield (whose first wife had been Caroline Lee Bouvier, the sister of Jacqueline Kennedy Onassis). Laura Canfield was the second daughter of the Hon. Guy Lawrence Charteris (the second son of Hugo Charteris, 11th Earl of Wemyss and Lady Frances Lucy Tennant). Laura's older sister, Ann Geraldine Mary Charteris, was married to the novelist Ian Fleming. Laura herself was previously married to and divorced from Walter Long, 2nd Viscount Long and William Ward, 3rd Earl of Dudley.

The Duke died at a hospital in London on 11 March 1972, and was succeeded by his son John Spencer-Churchill, Marquess of Blandford. He and his first wife are buried in the churchyard of St Martin's Church, Bladon.

Descendants
Through his eldest daughter, Lady Sarah (who inherited the bulk of his mother's estate upon her death in 1965), he was a grandfather of four: Serena Mary Churchill Russell (b. 1944) (who married Neil Balfour), Consuelo Sarah Russell (b. 1946), Alexandra Brenda Russell (b. 1949), and Jacqueline Russell (b. 1958).

Through his second daughter, Lady Caroline, he was a grandfather of three: Michael Thomas Waterhouse (b. 1949), Elizabeth Ann Waterhouse (b. 1951) (who married Sir Richard Gervase Beckett), and David Charles Waterhouse (b. 1956).

Through his third daughter Lady Rosemary, he was a grandfather of three: Alexander Pepys Muir (b.  1954) (a godson of Princess Margaret), Simon Huntly Muir (b. 1959), and Mary Arabella Muir (b. 1962).

Through his youngest son, Lord Charles, he was a grandfather of three: Rupert John Harold Mark Spencer-Churchill (b. 1971), Dominic Albert Charles Spencer-Churchill (b. 1979), and Alexander David Spencer-Churchill (b. 1983).

References

External links

 John Albert William Spencer-Churchill, 10th Duke of Marlborough, thepeerage.com

1897 births
1972 deaths
British Life Guards officers
Burials at St Martin's Church, Bladon
Deputy Lieutenants of Oxfordshire
110
English people of American descent
English people of Dutch descent
People educated at Eton College
John Spencer-Churchill, 10th Duke
John Spencer-Churchill, 10th Duke of Marlborough
British Army personnel of World War I